Memorial Stadium was a 4,000-seat multi-purpose arena, in St. John's, Newfoundland and Labrador, Canada. St. John's previous indoor arena, Prince's Rink, burned down in November 1941, but the demands of the Second World War prevented the city from replacing it until well after the war ended. In 1948, a Citizens' Committee was established to raise funds to build a new arena to be named in honour of Newfoundlanders who died in that war. Fundraising went slowly until in 1954, St. John's City Council floated a bond to finance the facility, which then became property of the city. It officially opened in 1955.

It is the former home of the St. John's Maple Leafs of the American Hockey League (1991–2001). The arena played host to many events, such as an exhibition game featuring the local senior hockey team, the St. John's Caps and the Soviet Red Army. It also played host to two NBA exhibition games and musical acts, as well as Pope John Paul II. Wooden bleachers were used throughout the building's earlier life, and plastic seats were installed later, towards the beginning of the arena’s AHL tenure. Memorial Stadium closed in 2001, replaced by Mile One Centre.

Dominion Memorial Market
The interior structure of the building was later torn down, and in July 2006, after much controversy, construction started on a new Dominion supermarket. Coincidentally, the parent company of Dominion in Newfoundland, Loblaw Companies, converted part of Maple Leaf Gardens in Toronto, the former stadium of the Maple Leafs' parent club, to a Loblaws supermarket; both projects were approved despite grassroots protests.

On September 21, 2007 Mayor Andy Wells cut the ribbon opening Dominion Memorial Market. The converted stadium features underground parking, escalators, and shopping cart conveyors. The store also retains the scoreboard from the stadium's days as a hockey arena.

See also
Architecture of St. John's

References

Former ice hockey venues in Newfoundland and Labrador
Defunct indoor ice hockey venues in Canada
Sports venues in St. John's, Newfoundland and Labrador
Defunct indoor arenas in Canada
St. John's Maple Leafs
Monuments and memorials in Newfoundland and Labrador
World War II memorials in Canada
Sports venues completed in 1955
1955 establishments in Newfoundland and Labrador
2001 disestablishments in Newfoundland and Labrador